Last Young Renegade is the seventh studio album by American rock band All Time Low. It was released on June 2, 2017, and is their first release with Fueled by Ramen. The lead single, "Dirty Laundry", premiered on BBC Radio 1 on February 17, 2017. The album debuted at number nine on the US Billboard 200, selling 33,000 units in its first week.

Background and recording
Following the release of Future Hearts in April 2015, All Time Low began working on their next album shortly afterwards. The band spent several weeks staying at ranches in Big Bear and Palm Springs, California. Here, the band had a lot of time for "reflecting and soul-searching", according to vocalist/guitarist Alex Gaskarth.

In June 2016, Gaskarth emailed guitarist Jack Barakat a demo of "Dirty Laundry", which Barakat was immediately impressed by. Later that month, the band began recording Last Young Renegade at EastWest Studios in Los Angeles. With no deadline, the band worked at their own pace. The members would turn up at midday for the sessions, "playing around 'til something cool came out", according to Gaskarth. On occasion, Gaskarth would leave the studio enthusiastic with the progress being made on the album, other times he would feel burned out, incapable of listening to music for two days in a row.

Composition

Music and lyrics
Gaskarth stated the band were concerned with "just pushing ourselves forward" with Last Young Renegade, wishing to "explore ... some darker tones". He said he was "reflecting more on my demons this time around". Gaskarth also said: "Our friends are getting married, ... having kids, ... passing away[, which added] another level of gravitas to things". Halfway through the writing process, while in the middle of working on four songs, the band came up with "Dirty Laundry" which helped "shaped the rest of the album."

Gaskarth mentioned the album had "a lot of indirect '80s influence on [it], and we had a lot of fun with analog keyboards." Gaskarth noted David Bowie and Prince as influences on the album. With "Last Young Renegade", Gaskarth said the group "needed to open [the album] with a banger, and open with one that had a lot of energy and movement." He was unsure if the song was going to feature on the album "until later [on] ... there was this story forming and that 'Last Young Renegade' could be such a cool piece of what the record was about". Gaskarth explained that while Future Hearts was composed from the viewpoint of the band "talking about our youth," "Dirty Laundry" was written "from the other perspective ... taking more of a nostalgic approach." He also said the track discusses "the guilty conscience and the mistakes that you've made and coming to terms with those and wearing them as badges."

Release
On February 13, 2017, the band posted a teaser video. On February 17, the band announced they had signed to Fueled by Ramen since the start of 2016. Gaskarth explained that following their previous album Future Hearts, the band were unsigned and were looking for a new label. He said signing with Fueled by Ramen was the "perfect opportunity ... They really let us be who we want to be. There was no one there trying to shape us or guide us or direct us where to go from here." On the same day, a music video was released for "Dirty Laundry", directed by Pat Tracy. Gaskarth said the video was influenced by "a dream about the ups and downs that make us who we are, sometimes worn and tired, but better for it... alive and inspired." A day later, the song was released as a single. On February 23, Last Young Renegade was announced for release, as well its artwork and track listing was revealed. In March, the band went on a tour of the UK with support from SWMRS and Waterparks.

On March 23, a music video was released for "Last Young Renegade", directed by Tracy. A day later, the song was released as a single. On April 28, a music video was released for "Life of the Party", directed by Tracy. The track was released as a single. In May, the band went on a tour of Australia with support from Neck Deep and The Maine. On May 19, a music video was released for "Nice2KnoU", directed by Tracy. It was also released as a single. "Good Times" was made available for streaming on May 31. Last Young Renegade was released on June 2. The band promoted its release with a number of in-store signings and acoustic performances. In addition, the group released limited edition jackets based on the jackets they wore in the music videos. From late June to early August, the band went on a US tour, dubbed The Young Renegades Tour, with support from SWMRS, Night Riots, Waterparks and the Wrecks. Following this, the group then performed in South Asia. European shows then occurred in October.

A music video was released for "Good Times" on November 1. The group embarked on an arena tour in the UK in March 2018. On April 25, 2018, a music video was released for the track "Afterglow".

Reception

Last Young Renegade holds a score of 82 on review aggregator Metacritic, based on four reviews, indicating "universal acclaim", making it the band's highest scored album on the service. Interestingly, a vast portion of the album's critical support came from major mainstream music critics, unlike the band's usual tendency to receive moderate reviews from mainstream critics while receiving most of their overtly positive reception from critics heavily associated with the alternative  music community. In contrast to this change, said alternative sources like Alternative Press gave positive but lukewarm reviews to the album, with their major criticism of the album being that it was "too clean" for the band. Regardless, many critics who had previously often viewed the band's music as generic cited the album's pop-influenced sound as a major turning point in the band's development and noted that it established them significantly from their contemporaries.

Track listing

Personnel

All Time Low
 Alex Gaskarth – lead vocals, rhythm guitar
 Jack Barakat – lead guitar, backing vocals
 Zack Merrick – bass, backing vocals
 Rian Dawson – drums, percussion

Additional musicians
 Nick Long – additional guitars on track 4
 Jonny Litten – programming on track 3
 Blake Harnage – vocal and additional production on tracks 3 and 5
 Ben Sabin – Steinway piano on track 3, synths on tracks 2 and 7
 Austin Love – programming on tracks 2 and 7
 Cooper Fuqua – trombone on tracks 2 and 7
 Tegan and Sara – vocals on track 9, backing vocals on track 1
 Rex Coggins – piano on track 10

Production
 Patrick Tracy – creative direction
 Sam Spratt – cover artwork, art direction
 Andrew Cook – design and layout
 Pamela Littky – photography
 Carolyn Tracey – packaging production
 Anthony Reeder – engineering
 Alex Prieto – engineering
 Ben Sabin – engineering
 Nick Furlong – producer, additional vocals (tracks 3, 5, 7, 10)
 Colin Brittain – producer, additional production (tracks 1, 4), mixing (tracks 1, 2, 7-10)
 Manny Marroquin – mixing (track 4) 
 Serban Ghenea – mixing (track 3)
 Chris Lord-Alge – mixing (track 5)
 Mark "Spike" Stent - mixing (track 6)
 Ted Jensen - mastering
 Joe LaPorta - mastering (track 6)

Source: Last Young Renegade booklet.

Charts

Awards
Rock Sound Awards

References
Footnotes

Citations

Sources

 
 

2017 albums
All Time Low albums
Fueled by Ramen albums
Albums recorded at EastWest Studios
Albums produced by Colin Brittain